Anna Sergeyevna Ovcharova (born 16 March 1996) is a Russian figure skater. In 2013, she began competing for Switzerland. She is the 2014 Bavarian Open silver medalist, 2014 Challenge Cup bronze medalist, and 2014 Swiss national champion. For Russia, she is the 2011 Cup of Nice bronze medalist, 2010 Russian national junior silver medalist, and placed fifth at the 2010 World Junior Championships.

Personal life 
Anna Sergeyevna Ovcharova was born on 16 March 1996 in Moscow. She graduated from Collège du Léman in Geneva, class of 2014.

Career

For Russia 
Ovcharova began skating at age four, taught initially by Marina Cherkasova. At age seven, she began training at CSKA Moscow under the guidance of Elena Blagova, who would teach her double and triple jumps. Svetlana Sokolovskaya began coaching Ovcharova when she was about eleven years old.

Ovcharova made her international debut in the 2009–10 season on the Junior Grand Prix series. She placed fifth in her first JGP event in August 2009 in Hungary and then won silver in September in Poland. Her results qualified her for the JGP Final where she finished fifth. After winning the silver medal at the Russian Junior Championships, Ovcharova was assigned to the 2010 World Junior Championships. She placed first in the short program — winning a small gold medal for the segment — eighth in the free skate, and fifth overall.

Later in 2010, Ovcharova underwent laser treatment on a small cyst in her leg but her condition only worsened. She was then diagnosed with two large cysts and incipient bone necrosis, leading to surgery in Geneva in 2011 and in Moscow in 2012.

Ovcharova won the bronze medal at the 2011 Cup of Nice in October 2011. It was her last international appearance representing Russia.

For Switzerland 
In December 2011, Ovcharova began training with Peter Grütter in Geneva, Switzerland. In the 2012–13 season, she was the silver medalist at the Swiss Nationals. In spring 2013, she performed in Music on Ice shows.

In 2013–14, Ovcharova made her international debut for Switzerland. She placed 16th at the Cup of Nice and 9th at the Ice Challenge in autumn 2013. After taking gold at the Swiss Championships, she won her first international medals for her new country, silver at the 2014 Bavarian Open and bronze at the 2014 Challenge Cup. Ovcharova was named in the Swiss team to the 2014 World Championships in Saitama, Japan. Ranked 17th in the short program, she qualified for the free skate and finished 20th overall.

Ovcharova's first Grand Prix invitations came in the 2014–15 season. After placing 12th at the 2014 Trophée Éric Bompard and 11th at the 2014 NHK Trophy, she finished second to Eveline Brunner at the Swiss Championships. Ovcharova was not named in the Swiss team to the 2015 European Championships in Stockholm. Although selected for the World Championships in Shanghai, after a poor performance at the Hellmut Seibt Memorial she decided to cede the spot to Brunner.

On 14 April 2015 Ovcharova announced her retirement from competitive figure skating on her Ask.fm account.

Programs

Competitive highlights 
GP: Grand Prix; CS: Challenger Series (began in the 2014–15 season); JGP: Junior Grand Prix

For Switzerland

For Russia

Detailed results 
(Small medals for short and free programs awarded only at ISU Championships.)

References

External links 

 

Russian female single skaters
Swiss female single skaters
1996 births
Living people
Figure skaters from Moscow
Russian expatriate sportspeople in Switzerland